Shiff is a surname. Notable people with the surname include:

Buki Shiff, Israeli opera and theatre costume designer
Jonathan M. Shiff, Australian television producer 
Meir Shiff (1608–1644), German rabbi and Talmud scholar

See also
Shif
Schiff